Callisema socium is a species of beetle in the family Cerambycidae. It was described by Martins and Galileo in 1990. It is known from Argentina and Brazil.

References

Calliini
Beetles described in 1990